The Republic F-84 Thunderjet was an American turbojet fighter-bomber aircraft. Originating as a 1944 United States Army Air Forces (USAAF) proposal for a "day fighter", the F-84 first flew in 1946. Although it entered service in 1947, the Thunderjet was plagued by so many structural and engine problems that a 1948 U.S. Air Force review declared it unable to execute any aspect of its intended mission and considered canceling the program. The aircraft was not considered fully operational until the 1949 F-84D model and the design matured only with the definitive F-84G introduced in 1951. In 1954, the straight-wing Thunderjet was joined by the swept-wing F-84F Thunderstreak fighter and RF-84F Thunderflash photo reconnaissance aircraft.

The Thunderjet became the USAF's primary strike aircraft during the Korean War, flying 86,408 sorties and destroying 60% of all ground targets in the war as well as eight Soviet-built MiG fighters. Over half of the 7,524 F-84s produced served with NATO nations, and it was the first aircraft to fly with the U.S. Air Force Thunderbirds demonstration team. The USAF Strategic Air Command had F-84 Thunderjets in service from 1948 through 1957.

The F-84 was the first production fighter aircraft to utilize inflight refueling and the first fighter capable of carrying a nuclear weapon, the Mark 7 nuclear bomb. Modified F-84s were used in several unusual projects, including the FICON and Tom-Tom dockings to the B-29 Superfortress and B-36 bomber motherships, and the experimental XF-84H Thunderscreech turboprop.

The F-84 nomenclature can be somewhat confusing. The straight-wing F-84A to F-84E and F-84G models were called the Thunderjet. The F-84F Thunderstreak and RF-84F Thunderflash were different airplanes with swept wings. The XF-84H Thunderscreech (not its official name) was an experimental turboprop version of the F-84F. The F-84F swept wing version was intended to be a small variation of the normal Thunderjet with only a few different parts, so it kept the basic F-84 number. Production delays on the F-84F resulted in another order of the straight-wing version; this was the F-84G.

Design and development

In 1944, Republic Aviation's chief designer, Alexander Kartveli, began working on a turbojet-powered replacement for the P-47 Thunderbolt piston-engined fighter aircraft. The initial attempts to redesign the P-47 to accommodate a jet engine proved futile due to the large cross-section of the Thunderbolt's fuselage. Instead, Kartveli and his team designed a new aircraft with a much-slimmer fuselage housing an axial compressor turbojet engine in the rear fuselage, and an air intake in the nose of the fuselage, with air ducts running from the nose to the engine and taking up much of the fuselage volume. Fuel was mainly stored in tanks in the thick, but laminar flow airfoil, unswept wings.

In addition, the new aircraft had to use the General Electric TG-180 axial turbojet which entered production as the Allison J35.

On 11 November 1944, Republic received an order for three prototypes of the new XP-84 — known to Republic as the Model AP-23. Since the design promised superior performance to the Lockheed-built P-80 Shooting Star and Republic had extensive experience in building single-seat fighters, no competition was held for the contract. The name "Thunderjet" was chosen to continue the Republic Aviation tradition started with the P-47 Thunderbolt, while emphasizing the new method of propulsion. On 4 January 1945, even before the aircraft took to the air, the USAAF placed an additional order for 25 service test YP-84As and 75 production P-84Bs (later modified to 15 YP-84A and 85 P-84B).

Meanwhile, wind tunnel testing by the National Advisory Committee for Aeronautics revealed longitudinal instability and stabilizer skin buckling at high speeds.

The first prototype XP-84 was rolled out in December 1945, but availability of suitable engines delayed flight testing. The first prototype was transferred to Muroc Army Air Field (present-day Edwards Air Force Base) where it flew for the first time on 28 February 1946 with Major Wallace A. "Wally" Lien at the controls. It was joined by the second prototype in August, both aircraft flying with J35-GE-7 engines producing . The effort to break the speed record delayed the test program with the second prototype. The 15 YP-84As, which were delivered to Patterson Field (present-day Wright-Patterson Air Force Base) for service tests from January 1947, differed from XP-84s by having an upgraded J35-A-15 engine, carrying six 0.50 in M2 Browning machine guns (four in the nose and one in each wing root), and having the provision for wingtip fuel tanks holding  each.

Due to delays with delivery of jet engines and production of the XP-84A, the Thunderjet had undergone only limited flight testing by the time production P-84Bs began to roll out of the factory in 1947. In particular, the impact of wingtip tanks on the aircraft's structure was not thoroughly studied. This proved problematic later. After the creation of the United States Air Force by the National Security Act of 1947, the "Pursuit" designation was replaced with "Fighter", and the P-84 became the F-84.

Operational history
The F-84B, which differed from the YP-84A only in having faster-firing M3 machine guns (later F-84s also had provision to carry eight  High Velocity Aircraft Rockets (HVAR) underwing), became operational with 14th Fighter Group at Dow Field, Bangor, Maine, in December 1947. Flight restrictions followed immediately, limiting maximum speed to Mach 0.8 due to control reversal, and limiting maximum acceleration to 5.5 g-force (54 m/s2) due to wrinkling of the fuselage skin. To compound the problem, parts shortages and maintenance difficulties earned the aircraft the nickname, "Mechanic's Nightmare". On 24 May 1948, the entire F-84B fleet was grounded due to structural failures in the aircraft's wings. The F-84C featured a somewhat more reliable J35-A-13C engine of the same power as the A-15-C used by the F-84B, and modified fuel and electrical systems. Beyond these modifications, the F-84C was virtually identical to the F-84B, and suffered from the same defects.

A 1948 review of the F-84 program discovered that none of the F-84B or F-84C aircraft could be considered operational or capable of executing any aspect of their intended mission. The program was saved from cancellation because the F-84D, whose production was well underway, had satisfactorily addressed the major faults. A fly-off against the F-80 revealed that while the Shooting Star had a shorter takeoff roll, better low altitude climb rate and superior maneuverability, the F-84 could carry a greater bomb load, was faster, had better high altitude performance and greater range. As a compromise, the USAF in 1949 committed US$8 million to implement over 100 upgrades to all F-84Bs and F-84Cs, most notably reinforcing the wings to a similar standard to the F-84D. Despite the resultant improvements, both the F-84B and F-84C were withdrawn from service during 1952.

The structural improvements were factory-implemented in the F-84D, which entered service in 1949. It had been discovered that the untested wingtip fuel tanks contributed to wing structural failures by inducing excessive twisting during high-g maneuvers. To correct this, small triangular fins were added to the outside of the tanks. The F-84D was phased out of USAF service in 1952 and left Air National Guard (ANG) service in 1957.

The first effective and fully capable Thunderjet was the F-84E model which entered service in 1950. The aircraft featured the J35-A-17 engine, further wing reinforcement, a  fuselage extension in front of the wings and  extension aft of the wings to enlarge the cockpit and the avionics bay, an A-1B gunsight with AN/APG-30 range-finding radar, and provision for an additional pair of  fuel tanks to be carried on underwing pylons.

One improvement to the original F-84 design was rocket racks that folded flush with the wing after the 5-inch HVAR rockets were fired, which reduced drag over the older fixed mounting racks. This innovation was adopted by other US jet fighter-bombers.

Despite the improvements, the in-service rates for the F-84E remained poor with only half of the aircraft operational in April 1950. This was primarily due to a severe shortage of spares for the Allison engines. The expectation was that F-84Es would fly 25 hours per month, accumulating 100 hours between engine overhauls. The actual flight hours for Korean War and NATO deployments rapidly outpaced the supply and Allison's ability to manufacture new engines. The F-84E was withdrawn from USAF service in 1956, serving with the Air Force Reserve until 1957 and lingering with ANG units until 1959.

The final straight-wing F-84 was the F-84G, intended as a stop-gap until the swept wing F-84F entered service, but ordered in large numbers to build-up NATO air forces. The F-84G entered service in 1951, although deliveries were slowed by shortages of engines. Production continued until July 1953 with 3,025 F-84Gs delivered, with 789 going to the USAF and 2,236 to US allies as part of US military aid. The F-84G was retired from the USAF in mid-1960.

Flying the Thunderjet
Typical of most early jets, the Thunderjet's takeoff performance left much to be desired. In hot Korean summers with a full combat load, the aircraft routinely required  of runway for takeoff even with the help of RATO bottles (two or four of these were carried, each producing 1,000 lbf (4.4 kN) of thrust for 14 seconds). All but the lead aircraft had their visibility obscured by the thick smoke from the rockets. F-84s had to be pulled off the ground at 160 mph (140 kn, 260 km/h) with the control stick held all the way back. Landings were made at a similar speed. For comparison, the North American P-51 Mustang landed at approximately 120 mph (100 kn, 190 km/h). Despite the "hot" landing speeds, the Thunderjet was easy to fly on instruments and crosswinds did not present much of a problem.

Thanks to the thick straight wing the Thunderjet rapidly reached its Mach 0.82 limitation at full throttle and low altitude. The aircraft had sufficient power to fly faster, but exceeding the Mach limit at low altitudes resulted in a violent pitch-up and structural failure causing the wings to break off. Above , the F-84 could be flown faster but at the expense of severe buffeting. However, the airspeed was sufficiently easy to control to make safe dive bombing from 10,000 ft possible. The top speed limitation proved troublesome against Soviet Mikoyan-Gurevich MiG-15s in Korea. Slower than the MiG, the F-84 was also unable to turn tightly with a maximum instantaneous-turn load of only 3 gs followed by rapid loss of airspeed. One F-84E pilot credited with two MiG kills achieved his second victory by intentionally flying his aircraft into pitch-up. The MiGs chasing him were unable to follow the violent maneuver and one crashed into the ground. Luckily for the F-84E pilot, the aircraft did not disintegrate but the airframe did suffer heavy warping. The F-84 was a stable gun platform and the computing gunsight aided in accurate gunnery and bombing. Pilots praised the aircraft for Republic's legendary ruggedness.

Pilots nicknamed the Thunderjet "The Lead Sled". It was also called "The Iron Crowbar", "a hole sucking air", "The Hog" ("The Groundhog"), and "The World's Fastest Tricycle", "Ground Loving Whore" as a testament to its long takeoff rolls. F-84 lore stated that all aircraft were equipped with a "sniffer" device that, upon passing takeoff safety speed, would look for the dirt at the end of the runway. As soon as the device could smell the dirt, the controls would turn on and let the pilot fly off the ground. In the same vein, it was suggested a bag of dirt should be carried in the front landing gear well. Upon reaching takeoff safety speed, the pilot would dump the dirt under the wheels, fooling the sniffer device.

Korean War
The Thunderjet had a distinguished record during the Korean War. After the entry of the People's Republic of China into the war in October 1950, the US Fifth Air Force requested that a wing of F-84s be sent to Korea. While the F-84B and F-84C could not be deployed overseas because their J35 engines had a service life of only 40 hours, the F-84D and F-84E were more suitable, and so the F-84E-equipped 27th Fighter Escort Group was sent to the Far East aboard the aircraft carrier , which arrived in Japan on 30 November 1950. After maintenance, the F-84s moved to Taegu airfield (known as K-2), flying its first operational missions on 7 December 1950. The aircraft were initially tasked with escorting the B-29 Superfortress bombers. The first Thunderjet air-to-air victory was scored on 21 January 1951 at the cost of two F-84s. The F-84 was outmatched by the swept-wing Soviet Mikoyan-Gurevich MiG-15, which was both faster and more manoeuvrable, and the MiG counter-air mission was soon given to the F-86 Sabre. The F-84 switched to the ground attack role at which it excelled.

The number of units operating the F-84 over Korea gradually increased, both by bringing over Air National Guard Groups from the US, and converting F-80 squadrons already in theater. The F-84 flew a total of 86,408 missions, dropping 55,586 tons (50,427 metric tons) of bombs and 6,129 tons (5,560 metric tons) of napalm, and firing 22,154 rockets. The USAF claimed F-84s were responsible for 60% of all ground targets destroyed in the war. Notable F-84 operations included the 1952 attack on the Sui-ho Dam. During the war, the F-84 became the first USAF fighter to utilize aerial refueling. In aerial combat, F-84 pilots were credited with eight MiG-15 kills against a Soviet-claimed loss of 64 aircraft. The total losses were 335 F-84D, E and G models. According to the USAF FY1953 statistical digest, during the Korean war, 305 F-84s were lost, including 249 in combat missions and 56 non-combat losses.

Western Europe
A notable incident occurred on 10 March 1953, when two Czech MiG 15 fighters intercepted two US Air Force F-84Es that were claimed to strayed from German to Czechoslovakian airspace and shot one down. It crashed on the German side of the border and the pilot successfully ejected.

Portugal
Portugal received its first F-84s in January 1953, with 25 new build F-84Gs later supplemented by USAFE stocks and from other European operators, with deliveries eventually reaching 125 F-84Gs. They were the Força Aérea Portuguesa's first operational jet fighters. Two squadrons were formed in Portugal, operating the F-84 in both air-defense and ground attack roles, with the Thunderjet also equipping an aerobatic display team, the Dragões. In 1960, the two operational F-84 squadrons were disbanded and the remaining F-84s transferred to training units. In 1961, however, an uprising against Portuguese rule began in Angola, and as a result, 25 F-84Gs were refurbished by OGMA and sent to Angola, with the first aircraft arriving at Luanda in August that year. There, they formed the Esquadra 91 (91st Squadron), carrying out bomb, rocket and gun attacks against separatist forces. In 1966, after Rhodesia's Unilateral Declaration of Independence, and the imposition of the Beira Patrol by the British Royal Navy to attempt to stop the flow of fuel to Rhodesia via the port of Beira, Mozambique, a detachment of eight F-84s was sent from Luanda to Mozambique to guard against potential clashes with British forces, with the aircraft returning to Angola when the threat of military action receded. Attrition of the F-84s was heavy, and by 1973, only five F-84s remained operational, with the last examples withdrawn from use that year, although the F-84G nominally remained in Portuguese service until October 1975.

Republic of China
The Republic of China Air Force received surplus F-84Gs from the USAF from 1953, and during the Second Taiwan Strait Crisis in 1958, its F-84s engaging in air-to-air combat against People's Liberation Army Air Force MiG-15s and MiG-17 fighters, with losses on both sides. The Republic of China replaced its Thunderjets with F-100s from later that year.

Notable achievements
 The F-84 was the first aircraft flown by the U.S. Air Force Thunderbirds, which operated F-84G Thunderjets from 1953 to 1955 and F-84F Thunderstreaks from 1955 to 1956. The F-84E was also flown by the  team of United States Air Forces Europe (USAFE).
 On 7 September 1946, the second XP-84 prototype set a national speed record of 607.2 mph (527.6 kn, 977.2 km/h), slightly slower than the world record 612.2 mph (532.0 kn, 985.2 km/h) held by the British Gloster Meteor. None of these records exceeded the April 1941 wartime achievement of an Me 163A rocket plane at some 624.2 mph; itself first exceeded by the American Douglas D-558-1 Skystreak in August 1947, using basically the same Allison J35 turbojet engine as the F-84. 
 On 22 September 1950, two EF-84Es, flown by David C. Schilling and Col. William Ritchie, refuelled using the probe and drogue system from Avro Lincoln tankers operated by the British company Flight Refuelling Limited, flew across the North Atlantic from Great Britain to the United States. Ritchie's aircraft ran out of fuel over Newfoundland, but the other successfully made the crossing, which took 10 hours and 2 minutes and three aerial refuelings. The flight demonstrated that large numbers of fighters could be rapidly moved across the Atlantic.
 The F-84G was the first fighter with built-in aerial refueling capability and the first single-seat aircraft capable of carrying a nuclear bomb.
 On 20 August 1953, 17 F-84Gs of the 508th Strategic Fighter Wing using aerial refueling flew from the United States to the United Kingdom. The  journey was the longest-ever nonstop flight by jet fighters at the time.
 In 1955, an F-84G became the first aircraft to be zero-length launched from a trailer.

Costs

Notes: The costs are 1950 estimates and have not been adjusted for inflation.

Variants

Straight-wing variants

XP-84 The first two prototypes. Powered by  J-35-GE-7 engine, and armed with four .50 in (12.7mm) machine guns.
XP-84A The third prototype with a more powerful J35-GE-15 engine. This airframe was subsequently modified with a pointed fairing over the intake and lateral NACA intakes were installed into the intake trunks. 
YP-84A Service test aircraft with J35-A-15 engines and six guns; 15 built.
P-84B (F-84B)First production version, J35-A-15 engine; 226 built.
F-84C Reverted to the more reliable J35-A-13 engine, improved fuel, hydraulic and electrical systems; 191 built.
F-84D J35-A-17 engine, various structural improvements. The pitot tube was moved from the tail fin to the splitter in the air intake with fins added to the wingtip fuel tanks; 154 built.

EF-84D Two F-84Ds, EF-84D 48-641 and EF-84D 48-661 were modified with wing-tip coupling devices to allow them to link in-flight with the wingtips of a B-29 bomber and extend the range of the fighters. The B-29 and one of the EF-84s were lost in an accident on 24 April 1953, when the F-84s automatic flight controls were activated after link-up.
Stretched fuselage and enlarged cockpit. Most aircraft were retrofitted with F-84G-style reinforced canopies.  843 built. Some aircraft used as interim reconnaissance aircraft, with cameras in the wingtip fuel tanks, by Netherlands and Norway until RF-84Fs became available. 
EF-84E F-84Es modified for testing - examples included testing of air-to-air refuelling systems, use as a FICON test aircraft with a B-36 host and use as test aircraft for the ZELMAL (Zero-length launch, Mat landing) experiments for operations away from airfields vulnerable to nuclear attack using the booster rocket from the MGM-1 Matador cruise missile.
F-84G Single-seat fighter-bomber capable of delivering the Mark 7 nuclear bomb using the LABS, J35-A-29 engine, autopilot, capable of inflight refueling using both the boom (receptacle in left wing leading edge) and drogue (probe fitted to wingtip fuel tanks), introduced the multi-framed canopy which was later retrofitted to earlier straight-winged F-84s. A total of 3,025 were built (789 for the USAF for other users under MAP). Some used by Belgium, Denmark, France Italy and Yugoslavia as interim reconnaissance aircraft with cameras in the wingtip fuel tanks. 
F-84KX Conversion of ex-USAF F-84Bs into target drones for the United States Navy. Sometimes claimed that 80 aircraft converted but programme may have been cancelled prior to conversion or use of the aircraft.
Tip-Tow See EF-84D above, did not become operational. See FICON project
Tom-Tom Two RF-84K and B-36 wingtip coupling experiment, did not become operational. See FICON project
FICON F-84E and GRB-36D trapeze system, became operational. See FICON project

Swept-wing variants

YF-96A aka YF-84F aka YRF-84K F-84E 49-2430 converted to swept wing configuration, and powered by J35-A35. The "first prototype" for the F-84F Thunderstreak.
YF-84F Modified prototypes with Wright J65 engine and deeper fuselage. Two built.
F-84F Thunderstreak Production version with swept wing and J65 engine.
RF-84F Thunderflash Reconnaissance version of the F-84F, 715 built.
RF-84K FICON project Reconnaissance version of the F model, 25 built to hang from the Consolidated B-36 Peacemaker.
XF-84H Thunderscreech Experimental supersonic-turboprop version.
YF-84J Two conversions with the General Electric J73 engine.

Operators

Belgian Air Force operated 21 F-84Es and 192 F-84Gs, with deliveries from April 1951. Replaced by F-84Fs and RF-84Fs in 1956. 54 Thunderjets were destroyed in crahes in Belgian service, with 23 pilots killed.

Danish Air Force operated 240 Republic F-84G from April 1952 until January 1962 and 6 Republic F-84E

French Air Force received about 140 F-84E and F-84Gs.

Royal Hellenic Air Force received about 200 F-84Gs from 1952 until June 1960.
 Iran
Imperial Iranian Air Force operated 34 Republic F-84G from May 1957 until February 1965.

Italian Air Force operated 254 Republic F-84Gs.

Netherlands Air Force operated 21 F-84Es and 179 F-84Gs. They equipped the 306, 311, 312, 313, 314, 315 and 316 Squadrons.

Norwegian Air Force operated 6 F-84Es and 200 Republic F-84G from 1951 to 1960.

Portuguese Air Force operated 125 Republic F-84Gs from January 1953 until 1973.

Republic of China Air Force operated F-84Gs from 1953 until 1964.

Royal Thai Air Force operated 31 F-84Gs from 1956 until 1966.

Turkish Air Force operated 479 F-84Gs from 1952

United States Air Force operated 226 F-84Bs, 191 F-84Cs, 154 F-84Ds, 743 F-84Es and 789 F-84Gs.

Yugoslavian Air Force operated 219 F-84Gs from June 1953 until 1974.

Major USAF operational F-84 units

 12th Fighter Escort Wing/Group: F-84E/G
 14th Fighter Group: P/F-84B (1947–1949)
 20th Fighter Bomber Wing/Group:F-84B/C/D/E/G 
 27th Fighter Escort Wing/Group: F-84E/G
 31st Fighter Escort Wing/Group: F-84C/E/G
 33rd Fighter Group: F-84C
 36th Fighter-Bomber Wing: F-84E/G
 48th Fighter-Bomber Wing: F-84G
 49th Fighter Bomber Wing/Group: F-84E/G
 58th Fighter Bomber Group: F-84E/G
 78th Fighter Group/78th Fighter Interception Wing: F-84D (1949–1952)
 86th Fighter-Bomber Wing: F-84E/G
 113th Fighter-Interceptor Wing: F-84C
 116th Fighter Bomber Wing: F-84E
 122nd Fighter-Interceptor Wing: F-84C
 123rd Fighter Bomber Wing: F-84B/D/E
 132nd Fighter Bomber Wing: F-84B
 136th Fighter Bomber Wing/Group: F-84E/D
 137th Fighter-Bomber Wing: F-84B/C/D
 312th Fighter Bomber Group: F-84E/G (1954–1955)
 406th Fighter-Bomber Wing:F-84E
 474th Fighter Bomber Wing: F-84E/G
 506th Strategic Fighter Wing: F-84G
 508th Strategic Fighter Wing: F-84G
 4702d Fighter-Interceptor Wing: F-84D
 4709th Fighter-Interceptor Wing: F-84G
 4710th Fighter-Interceptor Wing
 4925th Test Group (Atomic): F-84E/G

Royal Netherlands Air Force operational F-84 units
 306 Squadron: F-84E
 311 Squadron: F-84E
 312 Squadron: F-84G
 313 Squadron: F-84E
 314 Squadron: F-84G
 315 Squadron: F-84G
 316 Squadron: F-84G

Aircraft on display

Specifications (F-84G Thunderjet)

See also

References

Notes

Bibliography

 
 
 Donald, David and Jon Lake, eds. Encyclopedia of World Military Aircraft. London: AIRtime Publishing, 1996. .
 Forrer, Frits T. The Fun of Flying. Gulf Breeze, Florida: Holland's Glory, 1992. .
 
 Helferich, Willem. Squadrons van de Koninklijke Luchtmacht. Hilversum, Nederland: Romen Luchtvaart, 1994. .
  
 Jenkins, Dennis R. and Tony R. Landis. Experimental & Prototype U.S. Air Force Jet Fighters. North Branch, Minnesota, USA: Specialty Press, 2008. .
 Keaveney, K. Republic F-84/Swept-Wing Variants (Aerofax Minigraph, No 15). London: Aerofax. 1987. .
 
 
 
 McLaren, David. Republic F-84 Thunderjet, Thunderstreak & Thunderflash: A Photo Chronicle. Atglen, Pennsylvania: Schiffer Military/Aviation History, 1998. .
 

 Swanborough, Gordon and Peter Bowers. United States Military Aircraft Since 1909. Washington, D.C.: Smithsonian, 1989. .

 United States Air Force Museum Guidebook. Wright-Patterson AFB, Ohio: Air Force Museum Foundation, 1975.
 
 Wagner, Ray. American Combat Planes, Third Enlarged Edition''. New York: Doubleday, 1982. .

External links

"Our Jets Can Support the Guys On the Ground", Popular Science, September 1950, large article on the public debate about the F-84 in the close air support role, with photos and drawings.

F-084
1940s United States fighter aircraft
Single-engined jet aircraft
Low-wing aircraft
Cruciform tail aircraft
Aircraft first flown in 1946